English Plus is an American movement formed in reaction to the English-only movement.  The intent was to promote greater acceptance of language diversity in the United States in order to encourage a broader American cultural development and more international perspectives.  This would be achieved by encouraging education in English as well as secondary languages across the entire population, for immigrants and natives alike.  This movement has been supported by language education professionals and minority language advocacy groups.

"English Plus" resolutions have been passed in the U.S. states of New Mexico, Oregon, Rhode Island, and Washington.

History
The term "English Plus" originated in a 1985 letter to then-Secretary of Education William Bennett from the Spanish American League Against Discrimination.

Notes

See also

Seal of Biliteracy

References

 .

External links
 English Plus Versus English Only

English-only movement
1985 neologisms
1985 in education
1985 in the United States
Bilingualism